Simeiz Vallis is a valley at 13.2 S, 64.3 W on Mercury. It is named after Simeiz Observatory.

Extraterrestrial valleys
Surface features of Mercury